Armesberg is a mountain in Bavaria, Germany. It stands at 731 m or 2,398 ft tall.

Mountains of Bavaria